The 2013 6 Hours of Circuit of the Americas was an endurance auto race held at the Circuit of the Americas in Austin, Texas on  20–22 September 2013.

Qualifying

Qualifying result
Pole position winners in each class are marked in bold.

Race

Race result
Class winners in bold.  Cars failing to complete 70% of winner's distance marked as Not Classified (NC).

References

Circuit of the Americas
Circuit of the Americas
Lone Star Le Mans
Sports in Austin, Texas
Motorsport competitions in Texas